Sengar River is a tributary of the river Yamuna in the northern Indian state of Uttar Pradesh.

Course 
Sengar originates near Adhawan lake in Aligarh district and drains [Hathras District ]Etawah, Mainpuri and Kanpur districts before it confluences with the Yamuna between Kalpi and Hamirpur. It has a total length of 304 km (190 miles). The Sengar flows parallel to the Yamuna in Etawah district and is joined by the Sirsa river near Amritpur. It forms a doab with the Rind in Kanpur district. Much of the Sengar's basin in Etawah and Kanpur districts is under red loamy soil. The 1878 settlement report for Kanpur district also notes that the river is fringed by a series of ravines that had impacted adversely the fertility of the soil in the river's vicinity.

Etymology 
Sengar - originally called Basind - is said to have been named after the Sengar Rajputs after they captured most of Etawah following the fall of Kannauj in the medieval period.

Ecological issues 
Rapid urbanisation and industrialisation and the discharge of domestic and industrial effluents into the river has caused severe pollution in the river.

References 

Yamuna River
Rivers of Uttar Pradesh
Rivers of India